The PS Wingfield Castle is a former Humber Estuary ferry, now preserved as a museum ship in Hartlepool, County Durham, England.

The Wingfield Castle was built by William Gray & Company at Hartlepool, and launched in 1934, along with a sister ship, the Tattershall Castle. A third similar vessel, the Lincoln Castle built in Glasgow, was launched in 1940.

She was earmarked to become a floating restaurant in Swansea Marina in the early 1980s but was too wide to fit through the lock gates. She is now preserved at the Museum of Hartlepool as a floating exhibit at Jackson Dock, as part of the Hartlepool's Maritime Experience visitor attraction, which also includes HMS Trincomalee.

Pictures

See also
PS Kingswear Castle
PS Tattershall Castle
PS Waverley

References

External links

Wingfield Castle website
National Historic Ships

Ships built on the River Tees
1934 ships
Museums in County Durham
Ferries of England
Museum ships in the United Kingdom
Paddle steamers of the United Kingdom
Humber
Ships of British Rail
Ships and vessels of the National Historic Fleet